Bertone is an Italian surname meaning "descendant of Roberto". Notable people with the surname include:

 Alicia Bertone, American academic, researcher, and veterinary surgeon
 Catherine Bertone (born 1972), Turkish-born female Italian marathon runner
 Giovanni Bertone (1884–1972), Italian automobile designer, known for establishing the Carrozzeria Bertone business
 Leonardo Bertone (born 1994), Swiss footballer
 Maurizio Bertone, C.R.S. (1639–1701), Roman Catholic prelate who served as Bishop of Fossano
 Giuseppe Bertone (called "Nuccio", 1914–1997), Italian automobile designer and constructor
 Rosana Bertone (born 1972), Argentine politician
 Tarcisio Bertone (born 1934), Italian Cardinal of the Roman Catholic Church

Companies
 Gruppo Bertone, an Italian automobile company which specializes in car styling

See also
 Bertoni

Italian-language surnames